Yahya Musa Kisbi (born 1949) was the Jordanian Minister of Public Works and Housing. He had served as minister between 2011 and 2022.

Education 
Kisbi holds a Bachelor of Civil Engineering from the Ankara University and a Master of Construction Management from the George Washington University.

References 

1949 births
Living people
21st-century Jordanian politicians
Ankara University alumni
George Washington University alumni
Jordanian politicians
Public works ministers of Jordan